The 2004 Formula SCCA season was the first season of the Formula SCCA Pro series. Elivan Goulart won the inaugural championship. After this season the series went on a five-year hiatus to return in 2010. All drivers competed in Cooper Tire shod, Mazda powered Van Diemen chassis.

Race calendar and results

Final standings

References

Formula SCCA